Ruth Gallard Ainsworth (16 October 1908 – 16 May 1984) was a British writer, of over seventy children's books and numerous radio scripts.

Life
Ainsworth was born in Manchester, in 1908, the second child (and first daughter) of Methodist minister Rev. Percy Clough Ainsworth and Gertrude Fisk of Pendleton, her older brother being mycologist Geoffrey Clough Ainsworth.

Ainsworth's father died on 1 July 1909 from typhoid aged 36. Soon after the family moved to 2 High Cliff Villas, Cobbold Road, Felixstowe. Ainsworth enrolled at Ipswich High School, Woolverstone where she studied between September 1924 and July 1926. She later attended the Froebel Training Centre in Leicester.

On 29 March 1935 she married chemist Frank Lathe Gilbert in Leicester. On 7 September 1936, while in Lancaster, she gave birth to twin sons: Christopher Gallard Gilbert (furniture historian and museum curator) and Oliver Lathe Gilbert (urban ecologist and lichenologist). She had a third son Richard Frank Gilbert.

The Gilberts initially settled in London, but their house was bombed in World War II. They relocated to Porthmadog. Latterly the Gilberts lived in Corbridge, Northumberland.

Ainsworth died in 1984 aged 75. Her ashes were scattered in a stream in Wasdale.

Work
Ainsworth re-told classic fairy tales, as well as new stories of her own.

Ainsworth was a scriptwriter for Listen with Mother, a popular BBC children's programme.

Some of her stories were televised as marionette plays.

Bibliography
The series "Books for me to read", written with Ronald Ridout, has the secondary title "A book for me to read" on each cover.

It is not clear if the color sub-series ("Red book 1" etc.) is used throughout its history. Some or all of the books were republished with slightly different titles, for example  Pony Pony (London: Bancroft, 1965) as Pony, pony : my sixth reading book (Bristol: Purnell, 1983) while still in "Books for me to read. Blue series." Most or all of these books were published in the initial teaching alphabet.

 
 
 
 
 
 
 
 
 
 
 
 
 
 
 
 
 
 
 
 -
 
 
 
 
 
 
 
 
 
 
 -

References

External links

 
 

1908 births
1984 deaths
British children's writers
Writers from Manchester